Rudd Canaday is an American computer systems engineer and a previous member of the technical staff at the Bell Telephone Laboratories in Murray Hill, New Jersey, credited to co-develop the initial design of the Unix file system. In 2015 he joined a Palo Alto based tech startup, Entefy, as a Senior Architect & Engineer.

Research and career 
Canaday received his Bachelor of Arts (BA) in Physics from Harvard University in 1959 and received his Doctor of Philosophy (PhD) in Computer Science from Massachusetts Institute of Technology in 1964.

In 1960s, Ken Thompson developed a game called Space Travel on Multics file system, which ran very slowly on the machine. This caused Thompson to design his own hierarchical file system along with Dennis Ritchie, Doug McIlroy and Canaday. Joe Ossanna also joined Thompson, Ritchie and Canaday to program the operating system called Unics, later named Unix.

In 1973, Canaday along with Evan Ivie started developing the Programmer's Workbench (PWB/UNIX) to support a computer center for a 1000-employee Bell Labs division, which would be the largest Unix site for several years.

Selected publications 
 Canaday, Rudd H., R. D. Harrison, Evan L. Ivie, J. L. Ryder, and L. A. Wehr. "A back-end computer for data base management." Communications of the ACM 17, no. 10 (1974): 575-582.
 Canaday, Rudd H. "Two-dimensional iterative logic." In Proceedings of the November 30—December 1, 1965, fall joint computer conference, part I, pp. 343–353. 1965.

See also 
 History of Unix
 PWB/UNIX

References

External links 
 LinkedIn profile
 Why the co-inventor of Unix joined Entefy (Youtube video with narration by Rudd Canaday)

Living people
American computer scientists
Harvard University alumni
Massachusetts Institute of Technology alumni
Year of birth missing (living people)
Unix people